Robert "Bucket" Hingley is lead singer and guitarist for the ska band the Toasters.

Early life
Robert Hingley was born in Weymouth, Dorset in the United Kingdom in 1955. His family relocated regularly due to his father's career in the British Army and as such Hingley spent much of his early life abroad living in Germany, Cyprus, Kenya, Singapore and France. His roots are largely in Devonshire, hailing from a long line of Huxtables on his mother's side. His great grandfather, Charles, was one of the last of the great Appledore shipwrights.  Charlie Huxtable's brother Richard was technical advisor to the clinker-built replicas of the Golden Hind (Sir Francis Drake) and the Mayflower. His great great uncle, Captain Oates, was a member of the ill-fated Scott 1912 expedition to the South Pole.

Education
Due to his father's military commitments Hingley attended Drake's Mead boarding school and Tavistock Comprehensive in the United Kingdom before entering the University of York in 1974. He graduated with an honours degree in Linguistics from the universities of York and Strasbourg (France) in 1978 speaking six languages

Music career
Hingley emigrated to the United States in the late 1970s to manage the Forbidden Planet comic shop in New York City before forming The Toasters in 1981. After failing to convince American labels on the viability of ska music in terms of a domestic record deal, he founded Moon Ska Records, an independent ska record label, in 1983. The label went on to become the benchmark of the genre for fifteen years before folding in 2000. The label pressed more than 1,500,000 copies of releases by many notable ska bands. In 2003 he founded Megalith Records. Hingley continues to tour and record with The Toasters, and is the only original member of the group.

Aside from being active in The Toasters and Megalith Records, he also runs Cubo Consulting, a consulting business to the entertainment industry which specializes in tour production and resourcing. The business predominantly deals with American bands in Europe but also handles clients such as the John Lennon Foundation.

Hingley lives in Valencia, Spain with his wife and daughters. Rob's son attended the University of Kent, England.

Hingley uses a Fender Telecaster, a Reverend Eastsider T, and a Reverend Club King 290. In the early days of The Toasters, Hingley also used a Fender Stratocaster. Hingley uses a Fender Twin Reverb as his primary amp.

See also
 The Toasters
 Moon Ska Records
 Megalith Records
 Moon Ska World
 Ska Satellite Records
 Ska

References

External links
 The Toasters
 [  allmusic: The Toasters]

English male singers
British ska musicians
English male guitarists
Living people
Musicians from Dorset
Musicians from Tavistock
1955 births
Alumni of the University of York